Trueno may refer to:

Trueno (rapper) (born 2002)
Trueno (wrestler), Mexican masked professional wrestler 
Toyota Sprinter Trueno, a car produced from 1972 to 2000